Board of Bendigo TAFE v Barclay is a decision of the High Court of Australia.

The case concerned the dismissal of an employee of Bendigo TAFE. The employee was a member of the Australian Education Union (AEU) and was suspended after having sent an email from his work computer to all AEU members employed at Bendigo TAFE. Management then suspended him for not having notified them of serious instances of fraud discussed within that email.

It is a significant decision in Australian labour law, especially regarding the Fair Work Act's s346 protections against adverse action for participation in industrial activities.

Facts 

Greg Barclay was an employee of Bendigo TAFE. He was also president of an AEU sub-branch. He sent an email to all AEU members employed by Bendigo TAFE, that several AEU members had reported witnessing or being asked to take part in producing fraudulent documents as part of an audit.

A senior manager at the TAFE asked Barclay to provide the names of the members who Barclay had referred to in his email. Barclay refused. The CEO of Bendigo TAFE, Dr Harvey, then suspended Barclay.

At first instance 
Barclay and the AEU applied to the Federal Court for a declaration. They sought to establish that the TAFE had taken adverse action against Barclay for engaging in industrial activity, in breach of the Fair Work Act.

Under the Fair Work Act, Bendigo TAFE bore the onus of proof to establish that their reason for taking an adverse actions did not include a prohibited reason under s346 of the act.

Dr Harvey gave evidence that she considered an investigation into Barclay's actions were necessary because he had failed to notify management of serious allegations of fraud; and that he had instead cast aspersions and innuendo on colleagues. She said she regarded this to be in breach of Bendigo TAFE's Code of Conduct. She said she did not object to Barclay raising the issue of fraud with AEU members, and that she had taken action against Barclay instead for his failure for having raised such a serious issue with senior management. She said she would have taken the same action in similar circumstances against a person unrelated to the AEU.

Tracey J dismissed the application after accepting the evidence of Dr Harvey as establishing a lack of a prohibited reason.

Full Federal Court 
A majority of the Full Court, Gray and Bromberg JJ, upheld the respondent's appeal from the primary judge's decision. Lander J dissented.

Bendigo TAFE obtained special leave to appeal with the High Court.

Judgement 
The High Court unanimously upheld Bendigo TAFE's appeal in three separate judgements. On the evidence, the court held, Barclay's union position and activities were not operative factors in the decision to take adverse action. It was also noted by Gummow and Hayne JJ that Dr Harvey's evidence had not been challenged, and therefore a contravention of s346 could not be made out.

However, the court noted that positive evidence from a decision maker may be unreliable, because of other contradictory evidence. However, this was not found to be the case on the facts before the court.

The court additionally found that in regards to s346, it is the state of mind of the decision maker that is of relevance. Surrounding circumstances are only relevant insofar as they assist in elucidating that state of mind to the court.

See also 

 CFMEU v BHP Coal Pty Ltd
 Industrial Action

Notes

References 

High Court of Australia cases